Shadows of Doom may refer to
 Shadows of Doom, a fantasy novel by Ed Greenwood
 Shadows of Doom, a fantasy novel by Dennis L. McKiernan